Koljonen is the surname of the following people
Kalle Koljonen (born 1994), Finnish badminton player
Niilo Koljonen (1927–2004), Finnish social scientist
Pele Koljonen (born 1988), Finnish footballer
Toivo Koljonen (1912–1943), Finnish murderer
Vilho Koljonen (1910–2000), Finnish writer and photographer